Percy Richards may refer to:

Percy Richards (English footballer)
Percy Richards (Welsh footballer)